
Gmina Kolno is a rural gmina (administrative district) in Kolno County, Podlaskie Voivodeship, in north-eastern Poland. Its seat is the town of Kolno, although the town is not part of the territory of the gmina.

Villages
Gmina Kolno contains the villages and settlements of Bialiki, Borkowo, Brzózki, Brzozowo, Czernice, Czerwone, Danowo, Filipki Duże, Filipki Małe, Gietki, Glinki, Górskie, Górszczyzna, Gromadzyn-Wykno, Janowo, Kiełcze-Kopki, Kolimagi, Kossaki, Kowalewo, Koziki-Olszyny, Kozioł, Kumelsk, Lachowo, Łosewo, Niksowizna, Obiedzino, Okurowo, Pachuczyn, Rupin, Rydzewo-Świątki, Stare Kiełcze, Stary Gromadzyn, Truszki-Kucze, Truszki-Patory, Truszki-Zalesie, Tyszki-Łabno, Tyszki-Wądołowo, Waszki, Wincenta, Wścieklice, Wszebory, Wykowo, Zabiele, Zakaleń, Zaskrodzie and Żebry.

Neighbouring gminas
Gmina Kolno is bordered by the gminas of Biała Piska, Grabowo, Mały Płock, Pisz, Stawiski, Turośl and Zbójna.

References

 Polish official population figures 2006

Kolno
Gmina Kolno